UGT may mean:

 União Geral de Trabalhadores, the General Union of Workers (Portugal)
 Unión General de Trabajadores, the General Workers' Union (Argentina)
 Unión General de Trabajadores, the General Union of Workers of Spain.
 Uridinediphosphate-glucuronosyltransferase, a class of enzymes including UGT2B7, UGT1, and UGT1A1.
 Universal Greeting Time, an Internet Relay Chat convention whereby a person who joins a conversation is greeted "Good morning" and a person who leaves is bidden "Good night", regardless of the time zones of participants.